Baptist minister John Allen (ca. 1741/2 – sometime in the 1780s), although not well-connected with colonial patriots in British North America, had an enormous impact on re-igniting the tensions within the Empire in 1772 when he mentioned the Gaspée Affair and the Royal Commission of Inquiry seven times in his Thanksgiving Day sermon at Second Baptist Church in Boston.  This sermon, An Oration, Upon the Beauties of Liberty, Or the Essential Rights of the Americans, was reprinted seven times in four different cities, making it the sixth most-popular pre-independence pamphlet in British America.

Old World Troubles
In 1764, at age 23, John Allen was ordained and installed as the pastor of the Particular Baptist Church in Petticoat Lane, near Spitalfields, London. Like most Baptist ministers, Allen had to earn his livelihood through secular work.  He opened a linen-drapers shop in Shoreditch.  When his business failed, Allen's debt grew, and he spent some time incarcerated at the King's Bench Prison.  When the Petticoat Lane congregation dismissed him he briefly found a new pastorate at Broadstairs, near Newcastle.  But in 1767 he was dismissed by the Broadstairs congregation, and in 1768 he returned to London as a schoolteacher. By January 1769 he was again in financial trouble, and he was tried at the Old Bailey for forging a £50 note. 
Although he was acquitted, this trial destroyed his reputation, and its stigma followed him to Boston.

New World Success
In 1770, Allen published The Spirit of Liberty.  Already showing his radical political views and his sympathies for the developing American cause, this pamphlet argued for the return of John Wilkes to Parliament and defended the rights of the individual. Most chroniclers believe that he left London for New York in 1771 though Allen did not re-appear in the historical record until 1772.  At that time John Davis, the pastor of the Second Baptist Church in Boston had left his post due to failing health, so the congregation was searching for a new teaching elder. Davis knew of Allen and made it clear before he died that he wanted Allen to preach at Second Baptist. The church committee knew something of Allen's reputation in England and so was reluctant to invite him to speak. After some debate, they asked him to give the annual Thanksgiving Day Address. Elder Allen remained as a "visiting pastor" for just nine months, November 1772 until July 1773, Second Baptist never extended a permanent call to him.

Early Death
As stated above, Allen was not well-connected with other colonial patriots and we do not hear from him again.  Some argue that he continued to publish pamphlets into the 1780s; most sources placed his death at age 33 in 1774.  The Oxford Dictionary of National Biography dated his death between 1783-88.  Bumsted and Clark argued that it could be as late as 1789.

Further Study
[Primary and Secondary Sources for the Gaspee Affair]

References

1740s births
1780s deaths
People of Massachusetts in the American Revolution
1772 in the Thirteen Colonies
Clergy in the American Revolution